The Saint Patricks River is a perennial river of the Snowy River catchment, located in the East Gippsland region of the Australian state of Victoria.

Course and features
Formed by the confluence of the East Branch and West Branch of the river, the Saint Patricks River rises below Mount Jack within the Errinundra National Park, and flows generally north northwest,  before reaching its confluence with the Big River, in remote country southwest of the locality of Malinns in the Shire of East Gippsland. The river descends  over its  course.

The catchment area of the river is administered by the East Gippsland Catchment Management Authority.

See also

 List of rivers of Australia

References

External links
 
 
 

East Gippsland catchment
Rivers of Gippsland (region)